Hewick is a historic home located near Urbanna, Middlesex County, Virginia. It was constructed in 1678 by Christopher Robinson, whose progeny held considerable power in the colony before the American Revolution, during which some members became loyalists. It was listed on the United States National Register of Historic Places in 1978.

Now a two-story, five-bay, "L"-shaped brick dwelling, it originally had  stories, but raised to a full two stories in the mid-19th century.  The rear ell is popularly believed to have been built in the late 17th century.

It is currently operated as a wedding venue.

References

External links
Hewick House, State Routes 615 & 602 vicinity, Urbanna, Middlesex County, VA: 2 photos at Historic American Buildings Survey

Historic American Buildings Survey in Virginia
Houses on the National Register of Historic Places in Virginia
Houses completed in 1750
Houses in Middlesex County, Virginia
National Register of Historic Places in Middlesex County, Virginia